The Liberal Appeal (LA) was a Flemish conservative-liberal political party.

Founded on March 22, 2002 by the liberal MEP Ward Beysen (1941-2005) as a  secession of the VLD, mostly in Antwerp. The Liberaal Appèl was first a movement, then became a full-fledged political party on January 20, 2003. It took part, with a limited number of votes (less than 0,5%) under the 5% electoral threshold, at the May 2003 federal elections.

On January 14, 2005, Ward Beysen committed suicide, an event that created doubts over the party's future. There were meetings in the following months between the leadership of Liberaal Appèl and another VLD-dissenter, Hugo Coveliers, but to no effect, as Coveliers finally announced his own party VLOTT to break the cordon sanitaire around the Vlaams Belang.

On November 7, 2005 the party's leader, Jacques Kerremans, met his VLD counterpart Bart Somers in view of an electoral cartel for the municipal elections of October 8, 2006, and the reintegration of Liberaal Appèl into the VLD began at the local level.

On February 2, 2007 the party's leader announced that his party will participate at the open alliance of VLD / VIVANT for the general election of June 2007. This is a further step to reintegration into the VLD.

External links
 Guy Huybrechts, Fractie leader in Zandhoven (in Dutch)

Flemish political parties in Belgium
Liberal parties in Belgium
Defunct political parties in Belgium
Defunct liberal political parties
Conservative liberal parties
2002 establishments in Belgium
Political parties established in 2002
Political parties with year of disestablishment missing